Pasiecznik may refer to: 

the following places in Poland:
Pasiecznik in Gmina Lubomierz, Lwówek Śląski County in Lower Silesian Voivodeship (SW Poland)
Other places called Pasiecznik (listed in Polish Wikipedia)

the Polish-Ukrainian soprano Olga Pasiecznik